Qımılqazma (also, Qımıl-qazma) is a village and municipality in the Quba Rayon of Azerbaijan. It has a population of 889.  The municipality consists of the villages of Qımılqazma and Küsnətqazma.

References

Populated places in Quba District (Azerbaijan)